The National Board of Review Award for Best Directorial is an annual film award given (since 1997, with the exceptions of 1998 and 2000) by the National Board of Review of Motion Pictures.

Notes
 ‡ = Nominated for the Academy Award for Best Director
 ≠ = Nominated in other Oscar categories

Winners

1990s

2000s

2010s

2020s

References

National Board of Review Awards
Directorial debut film awards
Awards established in 1997
1997 establishments in the United States